The Polio Hall of Fame (or the Polio Wall of Fame) consists of a linear grouping of sculptured busts of fifteen scientists and two laymen who made important contributions to the knowledge and treatment of poliomyelitis. It is found on the outside wall of what is called Founder's Hall of the Roosevelt Warm Springs Institute for Rehabilitation in Warm Springs, Georgia.

History of the monument

Designed by Edmond Romulus Amateis, the sculpted busts were cast in bronze and positioned in an irregular linear pattern on a white marble wall. Amateis was commissioned by the Georgia Warm Springs Foundation to create the Hall of Fame for the celebration of the 20th anniversary of the incorporation of the National Foundation for Infantile Paralysis. On January 2, 1958 the monument was unveiled in a ceremony attended by the artist and almost all of the still living scientists. Eleanor Roosevelt, the president’s widow, represented her late husband at the ceremony.
There is a detailed coverage of the celebration including photographs of the sculptor and the persons involved posing in front of their respective busts in Edward A. Beeman’s biography of one of the scientists, Charles Armstrong (see below No. 6)

Individuals represented
The first 15 of the 17 bronze busts show 14 men and one woman, who were instrumental in polio research and treatment. The last two on the right are Roosevelt and his close aide Basil O'Connor. The first four are the European polio pioneers Jakob Heine, from Germany, the two Swedes Karl Oskar Medin and Ivar Wickman and the Austrian Nobel-Prize Laureate Karl Landsteiner. Nos. 5 to 17 are exclusively Americans. The order of the busts is not strictly chronological. In spite of his achievements in the field of fighting polio, Hilary Koprowski's (inventor of the world's first effective live polio vaccine) bust was not included in the monument.

Franklin D. Roosevelt and Warm Springs
Beginning in 1924, the 32nd U.S. President Franklin D. Roosevelt had regularly spent some time at Warm Springs and died there in 1945. He was struck with a  severe paralytic illness in August 1921, diagnosed at the time as polio, while vacationing with his family at their summer home at Campobello Island, New Brunswick, Canada. Roosevelt was permanently paralyzed from the waist down, and unable to stand or walk without support.

In 1927 Roosevelt founded the Georgia Warm Springs Foundation and a center that is now the Roosevelt Warm Springs Institute for Rehabilitation, a comprehensive rehabilitation facility operated by the state of Georgia. A center for post-polio treatment, it provides vocational rehabilitation, long-term acute care, and inpatient rehabilitation for amputees and people recovering from spinal cord injuries, brain damage and stroke.

See also
Paralytic illness of Franklin D. Roosevelt

Gallery

References

External links

Polio
Monuments and memorials in Georgia (U.S. state)
Buildings and structures in Meriwether County, Georgia
Tourist attractions in Meriwether County, Georgia
1958 sculptures
Bronze sculptures in Georgia (U.S. state)